Comai County is a county of Shannan located in the south-east of the Tibet Autonomous Region,

Comai County is famous for its Tibetan Mastiffs and known as the home of Tibetan Mastiff.

Tibetan Mastiff is 24-28 inches tall (at shoulder) and weighs 140-180 pounds. The dog is commonly found wearing a red yak's-hair collar.

Monasteries

Nahuoqie Monastery
Cijie Monastery

Counties of Tibet
Shannan, Tibet